Special Ops is a Canadian hard rock band from Montreal, Canada, first formed in 2002. The band is currently composed of Lead Singer Abe Froman, Guitarist Weka Soliman, Bassist Waldo Thornhill, Guitarist Hedi Baly and Drummer Manu Bessette.

Special Ops is known for its diverse sound, influenced by a range of jazz, 80s metal, and Middle Eastern strumming techniques. The band achieved considerable success in the early 2000s with their song "Anger's Creeping", which became the main theme for Spike TV's first two seasons of Sid's Cycle Show. Their song "Emily" gained similar acclaim when it was used as the soundtrack to Annabelle Cosmetics's Video Tutorial, 'How to create Custom QUAD FOXY Browns Look'.

The band's third album, Through the Heart of the Infidel, was written shortly after Waldo Thornhill's cancer diagnosis in 2012. Special Ops disbanded, taking a four-year hiatus after releasing their live album Live and Kicking (to let their fans know they will be back) before returning in 2016 with their EP Tangents. Though Tangents continued with their distinct blend of heavy metal, new age metal, and nu metal, Their most recent Single, Baby Take It All marked a shift towards a more mainstream, radio-friendly sound. The music video for the titular track, “Baby Take It All,” premiered on Metal Injection and has since received over thirty thousand views on YouTube. "Baby Take It All" was their second 2017 video release that had followed the launch of a music video for “Anger’s Creeping”. Special Ops returned on November 24, 2019, with a fresh new album dubbed “Blood And Tears”. In this self-produced 9th release to be followed by the second single "Dead Are Calling" before the full-length album and last single "I Put A Spell On You", along with Grammy & Multi Platinum award-winning Producer Steve Pageot, Mixing engineer Darius Szezepaniak and Mastered by Kevin Jardine Slaves on Dope guitarist.

After their bass player “Waldo Thornhill” has beaten cancer twice,  Special Ops have managed in less than 6 months to release 2 successful singles to follow up on their award-winning album “Through The Heart Of The Infidel”.

According to the band Their latest record “Blood And Tears” captures the hearts and minds of those who have struggled in protest and demonstrates the trial and tribulations they as a band have seen.

Charts & Accomplishments 
 I Put A Spell On You #12 on World Indie Music Charts 04-12-2020
 I Put A Spell On You #46 on Euro Indie Music Charts 04-12-2020
 Blood And Tears #06 on CJLO  03-06-2020
 Blood And Tears #08 on CHSR  02-18-2020
 I Put A Spell On You #13 on DRT GLOBAL TOP 50 ROCK AIRPLAY CHART 03-04-2020
 I Put A Spell On You #104 on DRT GLOBAL TOP 150 INDEPENDENT AIRPLAY CHART 01-06-2020
 Rotation on 150+ Radio stations worldwide (Satellite, FM, AM and Digital) 2020
 Dead Are Calling #1 Rock / Pop Rock Charts Berkshire Media Group (KMIX LA & affiliates) 2018
 Dead Are Calling#1 Rock / Pop Rock Charts WNYR New York 2018
 Winner – Best Alt Rock song - Dead Are Calling 2018
 Take It All Tour Endorsements by Godin, Serin Bass, Autopsy Report radio show, 247 Inkmag, ++
 Winner – Best Provincial Rock Video – Pressure
 Through The Heart of The Infidel #16 on CFBX 92.5FM 06-06-2010
 Toronto Exclusive Magazine Awards 2009
 Independent Music Awards winner Through The Heart 2009
 Winner – Best Metal Group – New Music Awards 2009
 Nominated at Toronto Exclusive Magazine Awards 2008 (Best Rock song, Best Rock Album, Best Rock Group)
 Anger is Creeping- # 2 on CSCR 12-01-2008

Style and influences 
Special Ops has claimed that their sound incorporates elements of metal, rock, reggae, jazz, hip hop, Middle Eastern, and Classical, likening their process to Fish Bone's and Faith No More's. The group has also cited Nina Simone and other jazz artists among their influences.

Special Ops earlier work has been compared to Metallica, Slipknot, and Disturbed as well as  System of a Down, Godsmack, Evanescence, and Nirvana. Their more recent, hard rock sound has been likened to, Monster Magnet and Eagles of Death Metal.

Special Ops uses a mix of vintage and modern gear, including  Charvel, Jackson, and Gibson guitars, Mesa and Marshall amplifiers, and custom Warwick and Surine basses.

Members

Current 

 Abe Froman  - Vocals 
 Weka Soliman - Guitar
 Waldo Thornhill - Bass
 Manu Bessette - Drums
 Hedi Baly - Guitars

Former 

Akbar Jhonson - Vocals & Guitars
Clarence Mcgillacutty  - Drums
Lance Du Jour - Drums
Dante Sanchez - Drums
Conrad Bevins - Drums
Hans Klopeck - Guitars
Late Louis Levesque - Drums & Percussion

Discography 

 Emily - EP (2003)
 Phase 1: In Search of Madness (2005)
 Phase 2: Amidst the Madness (2007)
 Pressure - Single (2009)
 Through the Heart of the Infidel (2009)
 Live & Kicking (2012)
 Tangents (2016)
 Baby Take It All - Single (2017)
 Blood And Tears (2019)

References 

2002 establishments in Canada
Canadian hard rock musical groups